Violet is a Dutch film written and directed by Bas Devos. It was released in 2014 at the Berlin International Film Festival. The film follows the routine of Jesse (15 years old), after witnessing a violent act against his friend.

Cast 
 César De Sutter - Jesse
 Koen De Sutter
 Mira Helmer - Marie
 Raf Walschaerts - Walte

Reception
In the United States' review aggregator, the Rotten Tomatoes, in the score where the site staff categorizes the opinions of independent media and mainstream media only positive or negative, the film has an approval rating of 85% calculated based on 20 critics reviews. By comparison, with the same opinions being calculated using a weighted arithmetic mean, the score achieved is 7.40/10.

In another review aggregator also from the United States, Metacritic, which calculates the grades using only a weighted arithmetic average of certain media outlets in most of the mainstream media, the film has 6 ratings from the press. attached to the site and a score of 77 out of 100, indicating "generally favorable reviews".

Writing for Cinema Crazed, Emilia Black published a positive review, noting that "Violet is a moving film but may not be for everyone as it is slow, moody, and depressing".

Nikola Grozdanovic, in his review for IndieWire said that "this is an exquisitely shot suburban tale of trauma, stretching the 'show-don't-tell' golden rule of filmmaking to the furthest reaches." For Variety, Ronnie Scheib called the film a "visually stylized, highly original depiction of a teen's stages of grief."

References 

2014 films
2010s Dutch-language films
2014 directorial debut films
2010s teen drama films
Dutch drama films
2010 crime drama films
Films about grieving